Thomas K. Hensley is a United States Air Force major general serving as deputy director of operations for combat support of the National Security Agency. He previously served as the director of intelligence of the United States European Command.

References

Living people
Place of birth missing (living people)
Recipients of the Defense Superior Service Medal
Recipients of the Legion of Merit
United States Air Force generals
United States Air Force personnel of the War in Afghanistan (2001–2021)
Year of birth missing (living people)